Roxy Ingram (born 11 May 1982) is a South African model. She has appeared in the 2003, 2004, and 2005 South African Sports Illustrated swimsuit issues.
She has been named number 16 in FHM’s coveted 100 Sexiest Women survey in South Africa.
In 2004, she was the girlfriend of English R&B singer Craig David.

Biography 
She started school at Aston Manor, Kempton Park, before moving to Cape Town where she attended Table View Primary and Table View High School. She matriculated at Progress College in Rondebosch.

Ingram is the youngest of three siblings. Her older sister Samantha and brother Richard both live in Cape Town.

Her magazine covers include Shape, Health & Fitness, SL, SA Sports Illustrated, and FHM Collections.

References 

1982 births
Living people
People from Port Elizabeth
White South African people
South African people of British descent
South African female models